Chaffin is a surname. Notable people with the surname include:
 Ceán Chaffin (born 1957), American film producer
 Chad Chaffin (born 1968), American NASCAR driver
 Cleve Chaffin (1885–1959), American carnival musician
 Colonel Chaffin (c. 1826–1873), American little person
 Jessica Chaffin, American actress, comedian, and writer

See also 
 Battle of Chaffin's Farm, battle during the American Civil War
 Chaffin's Bluff, in Virginia, United States
 Chaffin Formation, geologic formation in Texas
 Chafin

Surnames from nicknames